The Great Western Railway (GWR) 4575 Class is a class of 2-6-2T British steam locomotives.

History 
They were designed as small mixed traffic branch locomotives, mainly used on branch lines. They were a development of Churchward's 4500 Class with larger side tanks and increased water capacity. 100 were built numbered 4575–4599 and 5500–5574. 15 (Nos. 4578/81/89, 5511/24/29/34/35/45/55/59/60/68/72/74) were fitted with auto apparatus in 1953 to enable them to run push-pull trains on South Wales lines with auto trailers.

They often are referred to as Small Prairie Class tank locomotives.

Preservation 
11 members of the class have been preserved:

Two members of the class have also briefly been out on the mainline: 5521 and 5572. 5521 was shipped to Poland to take part in the Wolsztyn Parade, as well as briefly piloting the Orient Express. 5572 made an appearance at an open day in Reading as part of the GWR150 celebrations in 1985, arriving under its own power. When returning to Didcot again under its own power the engine also hauled the replica broad gauge locomotive "Iron Duke" alongside the preserved GWR Railcar W22W.

In fiction 
4566 with a GWR Shirtbutton logo was featured in the train chase sequence from the 1978 Disney film Candleshoe.

Models and toys 
Lima made a model of the 4575 class, number 4589, in GWR green, also a British Railways black-liveried version, running number 5574.
Bachmann Branchline have for many years made various versions of the 4575 Class.

See also 
GWR 4400 Class
GWR 4500 Class
 List of GWR standard classes with two outside cylinders

References

External links 

 4400 / 4500 tank classes
 Class 4575 Details at Rail UK

4575
2-6-2T locomotives
Railway locomotives introduced in 1927
Standard gauge steam locomotives of Great Britain